Gaudibert is a surname. Notable people with the surname include:

Casimir Marie Gaudibert (1823–1901), French astronomer and selenographer
Éric Gaudibert (1936–2012), Swiss composer
Pierre Gaudibert (1928–2006), French art curator and critic

French-language surnames